Gualter Salles (born September 28, 1970, Rio de Janeiro, Brazil), is an open wheel race car driver.  He raced in the 1997-2000 and 2003 CART seasons, with 49 career starts. His best finish came in his last race, the Gold Coast Indy 300 at Surfers Paradise in Australia, where he finished sixth. Salles also raced one competition in the Indy Racing League in 1999. Also competed in Stock Car Brasil.

Motorsports career results

American open–wheel racing results
(key)

CART

Indy Racing League

External links
Driver Database Profile

1970 births
Living people
Brazilian racing drivers
IndyCar Series drivers
Indy Lights drivers
Champ Car drivers
Brazilian IndyCar Series drivers
Stock Car Brasil drivers
EFDA Nations Cup drivers

RC Motorsport drivers
Dale Coyne Racing drivers
Bettenhausen Racing drivers
Draco Racing drivers
Fortec Motorsport drivers
British Formula Three Championship drivers